Rabbi Zephaniah Drori (born March 13, 1937) (2nd of Nissan, 5697) is the Chief Rabbi of Kiryat Shmona, Israel and the rosh yeshiva of the Kiryat Shmona Hesder Yeshiva. He also heads the Aguda LeHitnadvut (a Sherut Leumi contracting organization), and serves as Av Beit Din of the northern conversion beit din.

Drori is considered by many to be a leading scholar of the Religious Zionist camp. He first studied at the Bnei Akiva Kfar HaRoeh high school yeshiva when Rabbi Moshe-Zvi Neria served as rosh yeshiva. Later, he helped establish Yeshivat Kerem B'Yavneh, and then studied at Mercaz haRav yeshiva. There he became an important student of Rabbi Zvi Yehuda Kook.

Drori helped found the adjacent Yeshivat Yerushalayim L’Tzeirim yeshiva high school.

In 1968, with the blessing of Rabbi Zvi Yehuda Kook, Drori moved to Israel's northern border city, Kiryat Shmona, and became the chief rabbi. In 1977, he established the Kiryat Shmona Hesder Yeshiva.

Published works
Hegyon Libi Lefanecha (2014) - a commentary on Orot HaTorah by Rabbi Abraham Isaac Kook

References

External links
 Rabbi Tzfaniah Drori profile on the yeshiva website

Israeli Orthodox rabbis
Religious Zionist rosh yeshivas
Mercaz HaRav alumni
Living people
1937 births